Meden Rudnik (Bulgarian: Меден Рудник) is the youngest and the biggest neighbourhood of Burgas, which is the biggest city in South Eastern Bulgaria. Its population is about 31,000 people (2021). In 1975 the village Meden Rudnik was added to the territory of Burgas and the first apartment building was built in 1976. The old name of the neighbourhood was Kara Bair (Bulgarian: Черни връх), in English: Black Hill.

Note

This is a partial translation of the original article in Bulgarian Wikipedia

References

Burgas
Neighbourhoods in Bulgaria